The Office of Strategy, Policy, and Plans is part of the United States Department of Homeland Security.  It was created by the National Defense Authorization Act for Fiscal Year 2017, replacing the former Office of Policy, and creating a new Senate-confirmed Under Secretary of Homeland Security for Strategy, Policy, and Plans position.

Chad Wolf was confirmed by the Senate as the first Under Secretary on November 13, 2019. The current Under Secretary is Robert P. Silvers, who was confirmed by the US Senate on August 5, 2021 and sworn in on August 10th.

List of Under Secretaries 
 James D. Nealon (acting), July 10, 2017 – February 8, 2018
 Chad Wolf (acting), February 8, 2018 - November 13, 2019
 Chad Wolf November 13, 2019 – January 20, 2021
 Kelli Ann Burriesci (acting), January 20, 2021 – August 10, 2021
Robert P. Silvers August 10, 2021 – present

References

External links 
 

United States Department of Homeland Security agencies